Julian C. Chambliss (born 1971) is professor of history at Michigan State University and previously taught at Rollins College in Winter Park, Florida, and is primarily known as a scholar of the real and imagined city and on comics. He serves as coordinator of the Africa and African-American Studies Program at Rollins. He is the Coordinator of the Media, Arts, and Culture Special Interest Section for the Florida Conference of Historians. His work is in critical making; notable projects include Project Mosaic: Zora Neale Hurston, Advocate Recovered, and Oscar Mack.

Career
Julian C. Chambliss graduated from the University of Florida in 2004, after completing work on his dissertation on middle-class activism and city beautiful movement in Chicago and Atlanta. Since then, he has taught at Rollins College. and currently teaches at Michigan State University

Selected bibliography
 Ages of Heroes, Eras of Men: Superheroes and the American Experience
 Cities Imagined: The African Diaspora in Media and History
 Future Bear hybrid comic project created by Rachel Simmons and Julian C. Chambliss
  Black Perspectives edited by Julian C. Chambliss and Walter D. Greason
 Article about Julian C. Chambliss in Artborne magazine
 Black Superhero Documentart
 "The Ballad of Oscar Mack" news story on critical making project by Julian C. Chambliss
 Article by Julian C. Chambliss in the Boston Review
 Project Mosaic: Zora Neale Hurston Digital Humanities and Public Humanities scholarly work by Julian C. Chambliss et al.
 Advocate Recovered Digital Humanities project by Julian C. Chambliss
 "TED Talk" by Julian C. Chambliss

References

External links
 Julian Chambliss website
Publications by Julian C. Chambliss in the Rollins College Academic Commons

Living people
University of Florida alumni
Rollins College faculty
Comics scholars
1971 births